Stegobolus is a genus of lichenized fungi in the family Thelotremataceae.

References

Ostropales
Lichen genera
Ostropales genera
Taxa named by Camille Montagne